The Mouloud Mammeri University of Tizi Ouzou is a university in Tizi Ouzou, Algeria.

It is named after Mouloud Mammeri. As of 2012 Naceur Eddine Haddachi is the rector of the university. The university has eight faculties and twenty-five departments.

History

In 1977 President of Algeria Houari Boumediene inaugurated the Centre Universitaire de Tizi-Ouzou (C.U.T.O.) as per the executive decree No. 17-77 of 20 June 1977.

The University Hospital employed Africa's first woman neurosurgeon, Faiza Lalam, in 1982.

References

External links

 Mouloud Mammeri University of Tizi Ouzou 

1977 establishments in Algeria
Educational institutions established in 1977
Tizi-Ouzou
Buildings and structures in Tizi Ouzou Province
Kabylie